So Serious is the second album by indie rock band The Like Young.  It was released on Parasol Records in 2004.

Track listing
"Out to Get You" – 1:14
"You're No Cheat" – 2:04
"Tighten My Tie" – 2:18
"Worry a Lot" – 2:31
"Sabine & Me" – 1:22
"Routines" – 2:21
"Degenerate" – 1:32
"Heard Your Health" – 2:45
"Don't Know When to Stop" – 2:30
"Sharp or Messy" – 1:57
"Be a Sinner" – 1:30
"Really Up to You" – 2:07

References

2004 albums
The Like Young albums